Aaron James Rakers (born January 22, 1977) is an American former professional baseball relief pitcher. He attended Southern Illinois University Edwardsville and was drafted by the Baltimore Orioles in the 23rd round (697th overall) in 1999.

Rakers made his Major League Baseball (MLB) debut on September 8, pitching in three MLB games that season. In , Rakers spent most of the year pitching for the Orioles Triple-A affiliate, the Ottawa Lynx, where he had 92 strikeouts and 21 walks in 77 innings with an ERA of 2.57. Rakers missed the entire  season because of a torn labrum in his pitching shoulder and was non-tendered during the offseason. He was invited to spring training by the San Diego Padres in February , but did not make the team and was optioned to the Padres Triple-A affiliate, the Portland Beavers. Rakers appeared in only one major league game and became a minor league free agent at the end of the season. Rakers signed with the Houston Astros for the  season, but was released shortly after and signed with the York Revolution of the Atlantic League for the 2008 season.

In 2009, Rakers joined the La New Bears, one of the teams of Chinese Professional Baseball League (CPBL) in Taiwan. On March 31, Rakers won his first CPBL game, throwing 65 strikes and 36 balls over 6 innings. His career concluded in 2010 with the La New Bears.

References

External links

1977 births
Living people
American expatriate baseball players in Canada
American expatriate baseball players in Taiwan
Baltimore Orioles players
Baseball players from Illinois
Bluefield Orioles players
Bowie Baysox players
Delmarva Shorebirds players
Frederick Keys players
La New Bears players
Major League Baseball pitchers
Mesa Solar Sox players
Ottawa Lynx players
People from Highland, Illinois
Portland Beavers players
San Diego Padres players
SIU Edwardsville Cougars baseball players
York Revolution players